Bread Loaf may refer to:

 Bread Loaf, Vermont
 Bread Loaf Mountain in Vermont
 Breadloaf Wilderness in Vermont
 Bread Loaf School of English at Middlebury College
 Bread Loaf Writers' Conference, held annually at the Bread Loaf Inn, near Bread Loaf Mountain in Vermont
 Loaf of Bread Butte, a mountain in Montana

See also
 Bread
 Bread loafing, a method of processing surgical specimens for histopathology